The Noble Horse Barn, also known as Bass Barn, in the area of Murphy, Idaho was built before 1898.  It was listed on the National Register of Historic Places in 1991.

It is a two-story horse barn with a gable-roofed central block braced by shed-roof lean-to's on either side.

References

Barns on the National Register of Historic Places in Idaho
Buildings and structures completed in 1898
Owyhee County, Idaho